Empiric can refer to:
 Asclepiades of Bithynia
 A person who practices quackery
 Empiric school of medicine in ancient Greece and Rome
 Empiric therapy, therapy based on clinical educated guesses

See also 
 Empirical (disambiguation)